Pylorobranchus hoi is a species of worm eel known from the waters off of eastern Taiwan. Lengths of  TL for a female specimen and  TL for a male specimen have been recorded.

Etymology 
The species name honors Taiwanese ichthyologist Hsuan-Ching Ho of the National Museum of Marine Biology & Aquarium, Pingtung.

References

Ophichthidae
Fish described in 2012